High-temperature electrolysis (also HTE or steam electrolysis) is a technology for producing hydrogen from water at high temperatures.

Efficiency
High temperature electrolysis is more efficient economically than traditional room-temperature electrolysis because some of the energy is supplied as heat, which is cheaper than electricity, and also because the electrolysis reaction is more efficient at higher temperatures.  In fact, at 2500 °C, electrical input is unnecessary because water breaks down to hydrogen and oxygen through thermolysis.  Such temperatures are impractical; proposed HTE systems operate between 100 °C and 850 °C.

If one assumes that the electricity used comes from a heat engine, it takes 141.86 megajoules (MJ) of heat energy to produce one kg of hydrogen, for the HTE process itself and for the electricity required. At 100 °C, 350 MJ of thermal energy are required (41% efficient). At 850 °C, 225 MJ are required (64% efficient). Above 850 °C, one begins to exceed the capacity of standard chromium steels to resist corrosion, and it's already no easy matter to design and implement an industrial scale chemical process to operate at such a high temperature point.

Materials
The selection of the materials for the electrodes and electrolyte in a solid oxide electrolyser cell is essential. One option being investigated for the process used yttria-stabilized zirconia (YSZ) electrolytes, Nickel (Ni)-cermet steam/Hydrogen electrodes, and mixed Oxide of Lanthanum oxide (La2O3), Strontium and Cobalt oxygen electrodes.

Economic potential

Even with HTE, electrolysis is a fairly inefficient way to store energy.  Significant conversion losses of energy occur both in the electrolysis process, and in the conversion of the resulting hydrogen back into power.

At current hydrocarbon prices, HTE can not compete with pyrolysis of hydrocarbons as an economical source of hydrogen, which produces carbon dioxide as a by-product.

HTE is of interest as a more efficient route to the production of so-called "green" hydrogen, to be used as a carbon neutral fuel and general energy storage. It may become economical if cheap non-fossil fuel sources of heat (concentrating solar, nuclear, geothermal, waste heat) can be used in conjunction with non-fossil fuel sources of electricity (such as solar, wind, ocean, nuclear).

Possible supplies of cheap high-temperature heat for HTE are all nonchemical, including nuclear reactors, concentrating solar thermal collectors, and geothermal sources. HTE has been demonstrated in a laboratory at 108 kilojoules (electric) per gram of hydrogen produced, but not at a commercial scale.

Alternatives

There are hundreds of thermochemical cycles known to directly convert heat into hydrogen from water. For instance, the thermochemical sulfur-iodine cycle. Since the electricity generation step has a fairly low efficiency and is eliminated, thermochemical production might reach higher efficiencies than HTE. However, large-scale thermochemical production will require significant advances in materials that can withstand high-temperature, high-pressure, highly corrosive environments.

Mars ISRU

High temperature electrolysis with solid oxide electrolyser cells was used to produce 5.37 grams of oxygen per hour on Mars from atmospheric carbon dioxide for the Mars Oxygen ISRU Experiment in the NASA Mars 2020 Perseverance rover, using zirconia electrolysis devices.

References
U.S. DOE high-temperature electrolysis

Footnotes

Electrolysis
Hydrogen production